Arpi, Argyrippa, and Argos Hippium was an ancient city of Apulia, Italy, 20 mi. W. of the sea coast, and 5 mi. N. of the modern Foggia. The first name was Argos Hippium then Argyrippa and later Arpi.

Legend attributes Arpi's foundation to Diomedes, and the figure of a horse, which appears on its coins, shows the importance of horse-breeding in early times in the district. Its territory extended to the sea, and Strabo says that from the extent of the city walls one could gather that it had once been one of the greatest cities of Italy.

As a protection against the Samnites, Arpi became an ally of Rome. In the war with Pyrrhus, the Arpani aided Rome with a contingent of 4000 foot and 400 horse. Arpi remained faithful to Rome until Rome's defeat at the battle of Cannae, but the consul Quintus Fabius Maximus, son of the famous Roman dictator Quintus Fabius Maximus Verrucosus, captured it in 213 B.C., and it never recovered its former importance. It lies along a by-road leading from Luceria to Sipontum. No Roman inscriptions have, indeed, been found here, and remains of antiquity are scanty. Foggia is its medieval representative.

Notes

References

Cities and towns in Apulia